Catesby is a civil parish in West Northamptonshire, England. There are two hamlets, Lower Catesby and Upper Catesby, each of which is a shrunken village. The site of the abandoned village of Newbold is also in the parish. The 2001 Census recorded a parish population of 76.

Catesby Priory was a community of Cistercian nuns in Lower Catesby, founded in about 1175 and suppressed in 1536. In the eastern part of the parish is Catesby Tunnel, a tunnel on the former Great Central Line that was completed in 1897 and has been disused since 1966.

References

External links

Civil parishes in Northamptonshire